The political trilemma of the world economy is a concept created by economist Dani Rodrik to capture the trade-offs that governments faced in their responses to globalization. The trilemma holds that "democracy, national sovereignty and global economic integration are mutually incompatible: we can combine any two of the three, but never have all three simultaneously and in full." According to Rodrik, states embraced globalization and national autonomy in the late 19th century, but sacrificed democratic decision-making. In the post-World War II period, states sacrificed globalization while embracing democracy at home and national autonomy. The trilemma suggests that the backlash against globalization in the last few decades is rooted in a desire to reclaim democracy and national autonomy, even if it undermines economic integration. Rodrik first presented the trilemma in a 2000 paper.

See also 

 Impossible trinity

References 

Political economy